In Ancient Greek rhetoric, a comma (κόμμα komma, plural κόμματα kommata) is a short clause, something less than a colon.

In the system of Aristophanes of Byzantium, commata were separated by middle interpuncts.
 
In antiquity, a comma was defined as a combination of words that has no more than eight syllables.

References 
 http://rhetoric.byu.edu/Figures/C/comma.htm Part of a glossary of classical rhetorical terms.

Bibliography 

 Bruce M. Metzger, Bart D. Ehrman, The Text of the New Testament. Its Transmission, Corruption, and Restoration, New York, Oxford: Oxford University Press, 2005, pp. 45–46.
 Toivo Viljamaa, "Colon and comma: Dionysius of Halicarnassus on the sentence structure", pp. 163–178 in P. Swiggers, A. Wouters (eds.), Syntax in Antiquity , 2003

Rhetoric